Sebastián López may refer to:

 Sebastián López (footballer, born September 1985), Argentine goalkeeper
 Sebastián López (footballer, born October 1985), Argentine midfielder
 Sebastián López Serrano (born 1961), Spanish footballer known as Chano
 Sebastián López (art historian), (born 1949), argentinian- dutch art historian